'IAFL-2' is the third tier of American football in Ireland. 
The League was Founded in 2014 with the Tyrone Titans Winning the inaugural competition.

Like The Shamrock Bowl Conference (Tier 1) & IAFL-1 (Tier 2) the league contains teams from both the Republic of Ireland & Northern Ireland.

The aim of the IAFL-2 Conference is for new teams entering the sport. The IAFL-2 Conference is a more controlled environment than the SBC and IAFL-1 conferences, which gives new clubs the chance to build their team and organisation while still playing football at a competitive level. The winner of the IAFL-2 Conference can progress to the IAFL-1 conference

The current champions are the Donegal/Derry Vipers

History

Format

The League currently consists of Five Teams with the top Two meeting in a Playoff Bowl Game in the Post Season referred to as IAFL-2 Bowl. Historically both teams that appear in the Bowl Game are promoted to IAFL-1

Current Season (2016)

References

External links
 http://www.americanfootball.ie/contact-football/iafl2-conference/
 http://nfl-ireland.com/iafl/iafl-2-standings/

Irish American Football League
2014 establishments in Ireland
Sports leagues established in 2014